The Ñuble River or Rio Ñuble is a river in Ñuble Region, located in the southern portion of central Chile. Its main tributaries are Chillán and Claro River. The Ñuble River discharges into the Itata River.

Nuble River Level
It is a Class IV section, which means that the rapids are very challenging, but you don't need to be a professional to run this section. The biggest reason why this section has seldom been run is that it is hard to access – it requires three automobile river crossings as well as extreme off-roading skills. Farmers who live in the area usually use horses to commute back and forth from the village.

See also
List of rivers of Chile

External links 
 Nuble River
 

Rivers of Chile
Rivers of Ñuble Region